Protentomon berlesei is a species of proturan in the family Protentomidae. It is found in Europe and Northern Asia (excluding China).

References

Protura
Articles created by Qbugbot
Animals described in 1969